is a Japanese football player who plays for Kochi United SC.

Career
Matsumoto left Gainare Tottori when his contract expired on 1 December 2018. He signed for Kochi United SC of the Shikoku Soccer League for the 2019 season.

Club statistics
Updated to 23 February 2018.

References

External links
Profile at Renofa Yamaguchi

j-league 

1992 births
Living people
Association football people from Kanagawa Prefecture
Japanese footballers
J1 League players
J2 League players
J3 League players
Yokohama F. Marinos players
Ehime FC players
Renofa Yamaguchi FC players
Saurcos Fukui players
Gainare Tottori players
Association football midfielders